The 2016–17 Connecticut Whale season was the second in franchise history. For their second season, the Whale moved from the Chelsea Piers pavilion in Stamford to the Northford Ice Pavilion (seating capacity 1200), former home of the Quinnipiac Bobcats, in Northford, Connecticut.

Offseason

Trades

Free agents

Signings

Draft

The following were the Whale's selections in the 2016 NWHL Draft on June 18, 2016.

References

 
2016–17 NWHL season by team
Connecticut Whale
Connecticut Whale